Biomacromolecules is a peer-reviewed scientific journal published since 2000 by the American Chemical Society. It is abstracted and indexed in Chemical Abstracts Service, Scopus, EBSCOhost, PubMed, and Science Citation Index Expanded. , the editor in chief is Sébastien Lecommandoux.

See also
Macromolecules
ACS Macro Letters

References

External links 
 

American Chemical Society academic journals
Publications established in 2000
Biochemistry journals
Monthly journals
English-language journals